Family Tools is an American sitcom that ran on ABC from May 1 to July 10, 2013, and aired on Wednesdays at 8:30 pm ET. The series was created by Bobby Bowman, is produced by Mark Gordon, ABC Studios and ITV Studios America. It is based on the British sitcom White Van Man aired on the now defunct BBC 3 and produced by ITV Studios America's parent company, ITV Studios, and whose creator, Adrian Poynton, is also a co-creator and producer of the American version.

Thirteen episodes were ordered on May 11, 2012, for the first season. It was later reported on November 10, 2012, that ABC cut their order from 13 episodes to 10 because of scheduling conflicts. Family Tools was canceled on May 10, 2013, after only two episodes had aired. The show was not renewed for a second season. However, the remaining episodes aired over the summer.

Premise
The series follows a man who's had a streak of bad luck with everything from enlisting in the army to flunking out of seminary three times. When he returns home, he finds himself in the unlikely position of taking over his father's hardware-handyman business because his father was recently diagnosed with a heart condition. However, this transition is not as easy as expected as he tries to maintain the success of the business that his father built, especially with his father keeping a watchful eye.

Cast
 Kyle Bornheimer as Jack Shea
 J. K. Simmons as Tony Shea
 Johnny Pemberton as Mason McCormick
 Edi Gathegi as Darren Bichette
 Leah Remini as Terry McCormick
 Danielle Nicolet as Stitch Bichette

Episodes

References

External links
 

2010s American single-camera sitcoms
2013 American television series debuts
2013 American television series endings
American Broadcasting Company original programming
American television series based on British television series
English-language television shows
Television series about families
Television series by ABC Studios
Television series by ITV Studios